The men's team clay pigeons was a shooting sports event held as part of the Shooting at the 1920 Summer Olympics programme. It was the third appearance of the event. The competition was held on 22 and 23 July 1920. 48 shooters from eight nations competed.

The International Olympic Committee medal database shows Frederick Plum as medalist for the United States but he did not compete in this event. The correct medalist is Jay Clark.

Results

The maximum was 600. The first five teams qualified for the final.

References

External links
 Official Report
 

Shooting at the 1920 Summer Olympics